Gretz may refer to:

 Gretz-Armainvilliers, commune in the Île-de-France region, France
 Bob Gretz, American sportswriter and broadcaster
 Wayne Gretzky (born 1961), Canadian ice hockey player and coach